Platymiscium pleiostachyum is a species of plant in the family Fabaceae. It is found in Costa Rica, El Salvador, and Nicaragua. It is threatened by habitat loss.

Sources
 Americas Regional Workshop (Conservation & Sustainable Management of Trees, Costa Rica) 1998.  Platymiscium pleiostachyum. 2006 IUCN Red List of Threatened Species.   Downloaded on 23 August 2007.

Dalbergieae
Endangered plants
Taxonomy articles created by Polbot